The Advanced Research and Invention Agency, or ARIA, is a planned research funding agency of the UK government, announced on 19 February 2021.

The Advanced Research and Invention Agency Act 2022 created the legislative framework for the agency.

On 20 July 2022, the Department for Business, Energy and Industrial Strategy announced that ARIA's first CEO would be Ilan Gur and its first Chair would be Matt Clifford. In early 2023, it was announced that Nobel prize-winning organic chemist Chemistry  Sir David MacMillan and Dame Kate Bingham entrepreneur who headed the successful Vaccine Taskforce, would join the board, advancing the high-risk/high-reward research agenda.

With a similar remit to that of its US equivalent, DARPA, the agency will fund "high-risk, high-reward" research. Organisationally, it will be small, independent of UKRI (the main UK government funding body), with autonomy to operate at speed innovate funding, (for instance with X-Prize type inducements around research goals), rapid "seed" funding, with successful seeds entering a much smaller tier of large-grants, and bonuses for accomplishing research goals.

The announcement was broadly welcomed by senior figures in the UK's scientific establishment, although some have called for a clearer remit and direction for the agency. 

The agency's initial budget will be £800 million over four years.

ARIA is widely considered to be the brainchild of political strategist and former Vote Leave director Dominic Cummings.

Controversies

Labour MP Dawn Butler has said the fact ARIA is exempt from Freedom of Information requests would "raise alarm bells" about how taxpayer money is spent, in light of a scandal over how the UK government procured PPE contracts during the Covid-19 pandemic.

See also
UK Research and Innovation (UKRI)

External links
Official website

References

Funding bodies in the United Kingdom
Higher education organisations based in the United Kingdom
Research funding agencies
Research and development in the United Kingdom
Innovation in the United Kingdom
Public bodies and task forces of the United Kingdom government
Advanced Research and Invention Agency